Cinazepam (BD-798, sold under brand name Levana) is an atypical benzodiazepine derivative. It produces pronounced hypnotic, sedative, and anxiolytic effects with minimal myorelaxant side effects. In addition, unlike many other benzodiazepine and nonbenzodiazepine hypnotics such as diazepam, flunitrazepam, and zopiclone, cinazepam does not violate sleep architecture, and the continuity of slow-wave sleep and REM sleep are proportionally increased. As such, cinazepam produces a sleep state close to physiological, and for that reason, may be advantageous compared to other, related drugs in the treatment of insomnia and other sleep disorders.

Cinazepam has an order of magnitude lower affinity for the benzodiazepine receptor of the GABAA complex relative to other well-known hypnotic benzodiazepines such as nitrazepam and phenazepam. Moreover, in mice, it is rapidly metabolized, with only 5% of the base compound remaining within 30 minutes of administration. As such, cinazepam is considered to be a benzodiazepine prodrug; specifically, to 3-hydroxyphenazepam, as the main active metabolite.

See also
 Gidazepam
 Cloxazolam

References

Abandoned drugs
Anxiolytics
Benzodiazepines
Chlorobenzenes
GABAA receptor positive allosteric modulators
Hypnotics
Bromoarenes
Prodrugs